Highnote is an unincorporated community in Geneva County, Alabama, United States.

History
A post office called Highnote was established in 1896, and remained in operation until it was discontinued in 1909.

References

Unincorporated communities in Geneva County, Alabama
Unincorporated communities in Alabama